Verticordia verticillata, commonly known as tropical featherflower or whorled-leaved featherflower is a flowering plant in the myrtle family, Myrtaceae and is endemic to an area in the north of the Northern Territory and Western Australia. It is a woody shrub or small tree with relatively long, linear leaves arranged in whorls, and with irregular groups of creamy-white flowers in spring.

Description

Flowering time is mainly from August to October, sometimes in other months following rainfall.

This species can be distinguished from Verticordia cunninghamii and Verticordia decussata, which sometimes occur in the same area, by its whorled leaves and much longer style.

Taxonomy and naming
Verticordia verticillata was first formally described in 1977 by Norman Byrnes from a specimen collected on Eva Valley Station in the Northern Territory. The description was published in the journal Austrobaileya. The specific epithet (verticillata) is derived from the Latin word verticillus meaning "a whorl" referring to the leaf arrangement of this species.

Distribution and habitat
Tropical featherflower is widespread in the Kimberley region in Western Australia, and in the north of the Northern Territory, including some of the offshore islands. It grows in sand, often with loam or gravel in open shrubland and woodland.

Conservation
This verticordia is classified as "not threatened" by the Western Australian Government Department of Parks and Wildlife and as "of least concern" in the Northern Territory.

References 

Rosids of Western Australia
verticillata
Flora of the Northern Territory
Plants described in 1977
Taxa named by Norman Brice Byrnes